Gharibabad is a neighborhood in Karachi, Pakistan, that is within Malir District. Gharibabad was located along the tracks of the old Karachi Circular Railway.

References

External links 
 Karachi website .
 Trekearth.

Neighbourhoods of Karachi
Malir Town